Junior Engineering Technical Society (JETS) was a national non-profit organization dedicated to promoting engineering and technology careers to America's young people. JETS engaged students in various engineering education programs that were designed to encourage secondary school students to pursue engineering. In 2011 the TEAMS and UNITE Programs of JETS were acquired by the Technology Student Association

Activities 

JETS hosts their annual TEAMS competition. TEAMS is an annual theme-based competition for students in grades 9-12, aimed at giving them the opportunity to discover engineering and how they can make a difference in the world. This competition is divided in two parts. The first part, lasting an hour and a half, has 80 multiple choice questions. Each group of ten questions is related to a specific problem relating to the overall theme. The second part consists of eight open-ended tasks that are aimed at encouraging teamwork to develop the best answer. This competition is taken part by each participating school in a regional competition; the scores at that date determine the standings in the regional, state, and national level. There are six school divisions, one home division, one group division and two levels (9th/10th grade level & 11th/12th grade level).

Scholarships 
JETS, in conjunction with Power Engineering magazine, has annually awarded a $5,000 scholarship to at least one student to pursue a college engineering education since 2007.

Praise and awards 
In 2006, JETS was chosen as one of the "Best Practice" STEM education program for secondary schools by Bayer Corporation.

Publications 
Each month, JETS publishes a free e-newsletter available through their website.

JETS also publishes Explore, a magazine designed to inform students about potential engineering careers.

References

External links 
JETS website

Educational organizations based in the United States
Non-profit organizations based in Alexandria, Virginia
Organizations established in 1950
1950 establishments in the United States